The 2014 Svijany Open was a professional tennis tournament played on clay courts. It was the 2nd edition of the tournament which was part of the 2014 ATP Challenger Tour. It took place in Liberec, Czech Republic between 28 July and 3 August 2014.

ATP entrants

Seeds

 1 Rankings are as of July 21, 2014.

Other entrants
The following players received wildcards into the singles main draw:
  Steve Darcis
  Roman Jebavý
  Václav Šafránek
  Robin Stanek

The following players received entry from the qualifying draw:
  Marek Michalička
  Gianni Mina
  Thiago Monteiro
  Artem Smirnov

Champions

Singles

 Andrej Martin def.  Horacio Zeballos 1–6, 6–1, 6–4

Doubles

 Roman Jebavý /  Jaroslav Pospíšil def.  Ruben Gonzales /  Sean Thornley 6–4, 6–3

External links
ITF Search
ATP official site

 
Svijany Open
Svijany Open
Sport in Liberec
Svijany Open
Svijany Open